Tillandsia comarapaensis is a species in the genus Tillandsia. This species is endemic to Bolivia.

References

comarapaensis
Flora of Bolivia